T. D. Judah was the name of a 4-2-2 steam locomotive owned by the Central Pacific Railroad. It was named in honor of the railroad's first chief engineer, Theodore Dehone Judah, who had championed and surveyed a passable route over the Sierra Nevada for the Transcontinental Railroad.

History and career 
Like its sister engine, C.P. Huntington, T. D. Judah was originally built by the Cooke Locomotive Works in 1863 for a railroad that was unable to pay for it. Later, the two were seen in the Cooke shops by Collis Huntington and purchased for use on the Central Pacific Railroad (CP), becoming the road's third and fourth locomotives respectively.
Two other, larger engines, Gov. Stanford (number 1, built by Norris Locomotive Works) and Pacific (number 2, built by Mason Machine Works) had been purchased earlier.

Originally built as a 4-2-4T Forney type, T. D. Judah was a locomotive and tender on one frame. In 1872 the engine was rebuilt as a 4-2-2 with separate tender and may have been given other mechanical upgrades like its sister engine.

T. D. Judah was sold to the Wellington Colliery Company on Vancouver Island, British Columbia, Canada, where it found service as Wellington Colliery Railway's Queen Anne. It was subsequently scrapped in 1912.

In popular culture
In the 1991 film The Little Engine that Could, Tillie and Jebediah are based on this engine but are portrayed as 4-2-2 tank engines.

References
 
 
 

Southern Pacific Railroad locomotives
4-2-4T locomotives
Cooke locomotives
4-2-2 locomotives
Steam locomotives of the United States
Railway locomotives introduced in 1863
Scrapped locomotives
Standard gauge locomotives of the United States